Gérard Buhr (8 May 19288 January 1988) was a French film and television actor.

Selected filmography

  (1950)
 Quai de Grenelle (1950) - Petit rôle (uncredited)
 Beware of Blondes (1950) - Un journaliste (uncredited)
 Monte Carlo Baby (1951)
 The Straw Lover (1951) - Gaston's employées
 Maître après Dieu (1951) - L'officier allemand
 The passer-through-walls (1951) - (uncredited)
 Paris Vice Squad (1951) - (uncredited)
 Les Mémoires de la vache Yolande (1951)
 Les Miracles n'ont lieu qu'une fois (1951) - (uncredited)
 Les Petites Cardinal (1951)
 Shadow and Light (1951) - Le garçon de café (uncredited)
  (1951) - Presder
 Atoll K (1951) - Une sentinelle (uncredited)
 The Cape of Hope (1951)
 Nous irons à Monte Carlo (1951)
 Jocelyn (1952) 
 Fanfan la Tulipe (1952) - Un soldat
 Le Chemin de Damas (1952)
 My Husband Is Marvelous (1952)
 Follow That Man (1953) - Le jeune au flipper (uncredited)
 Les amants de minuit (1953)
 The Earrings of Madame de... (1953) - Le douanier (uncredited)
 La dame aux camélias (1953) - (uncredited)
 Alarm in Morocco (1953) - Bernis
 Le Chevalier de la nuit (1953) - Un policier
 Act of Love (1953) - (uncredited)
 Daughters of Destiny (1954) - Kennedy (segment "Jeanne")
 Tempest in the Flesh (1954) - Paul, l'ouvrier polonais
 Flesh and the Woman (1954) - legionnaire
 The Cheerful Squadron (1954) - Defaulter
 Yours Truly, Blake (1954)
 La rafle est pour ce soir (1954)
 One Step to Eternity (1954) - William Jordan
 To Catch a Thief (1955) - Inspecteur (uncredited)
 Les Mémoires d'un flic (1956) - Gérard Dominique
 Bob le Flambeur (1956) - Marc
 Elena and Her Men (1956) - Un soldat
 Alerte au Deuxième Bureau (1956) - Battini
 Michel Strogoff (1956) - Henry Blount
 Deuxième Bureau contre inconnu (1957) - Yerco
 Gates of Paris (1957) - Un inspecteur (uncredited)
  (1958) - Mario
 Me and the Colonel (1958) - German Captain
 A Bullet in the Gun Barrel (1958) - Alberto
 Normandie-Niémen (1960) - Le capitaine de Liron
 Lovers on a Tightrope (1960) - Henri
 Spotlight on a Murderer (1961) - Henri
 Le cave se rebiffe (1961) - Detective Martin
 The Black Monocle (1961) - Heinrich
 Léon Morin, Priest (1961) - Gunther
 Le Monte-charge (1962) - Le policier chez la vendeuse #1 (uncredited)
 The Law of Men (1962) - Le Patron
 À couteaux tirés (1963) - Ludwig Hermann
 The Train (1964) - Corporal
 The Counterfeit Constable (1964) - L'ami de Patricia
 Pleins feux sur Stanislas (1965) - (uncredited)
 The Night of the Generals (1967) - Colonel Claus von Stauffenberg
 Pasha (1968) - Arsène
 The Night of the Following Day (1968) - Fisherman-Cop
 Les Patates (1969) - Serge
 Le clan des siciliens (1969) - Un inspecteur
 The Deadly Trap (1971) - Le psychiatre
 The Day of the Jackal (1973) - Gendarme talking on the phone
 Love and Death (1975) - Servant
 Les Loulous (1977) - Le père de Ben (uncredited)
 The French Woman (1977) - Firmin
 Julia (1977) - Passport Officer 
 An Almost Perfect Affair (1979)
 Condorman (1980) - (uncredited)
 Your Ticket Is No Longer Valid (1981) - Hotel Clerk
 Enigma (1982)
 Five Days One Summer (1982) - Brendel
 S.A.S. à San Salvador (1983)
 Les Morfalous (1984) - L'officier du camp de ravitaillement
 The Blood of Others (1984) - Major Allemand restaurant Meurice
 A View to a Kill (1985) - Auctioneer

References

Bibliography
 Capua, Michelangelo. Anatole Litvak: The Life and Films. McFarland, 2015.

External links

1928 births
1988 deaths
French male film actors
Actors from Strasbourg